Acceglio is Italian cow's milk cheese made in Acceglio, in Piedmont Region.

It is made with skimmed milk, is unseasoned and must be consumed fresh.  It is produced only in the summer.

See also
 List of Italian cheeses

References

Piedmontese cheeses
Italian cheeses